vRPM, or virtual Revolutions Per Minute, was a term for a synthetic measurement of performance introduced by SanDisk for solid state drive (SSD) storage devices inside client PCs. vRPM was created to give users a metric to compare SSD performance to the hard disk drive (HDD) and to other SSDs. The term is no longer used. 

vRPM answers the question: "How fast would you have to spin a virtual HDD to achieve the performance of an SSD in a client PC?" It uses a language that users understand, RPM (revolutions per minute), that is a de facto industry standard to measure the performance of the HDD inside PCs.

Comparing SSD vs. HDD input/output operation 
The performance of a storage device can be quantified as the number of Input/Output operations Per Second (IOPS) it achieves. HDD IOPS is proportional to RPM. When a system requests to read/write data randomly from/to a HDD, seek time and rotational latency are two HDD activities that significantly reduce HDD IOPS. Seek time is the time it takes to move the HDD head to the correct cylinder to begin to receive data. Rotational latency is the time it takes to rotate the HDD platter beneath the head so that the data can be read/written. Rotational latency varies based on the RPM of the HDD.

NAND flash is used as the non-volatile memory inside SSDs.  It has faster random read than random write performance, since its write performance is delayed by the need to perform garbage collection to free space for writing. However, since NAND flash has no moving parts, the SSD achieves much higher IOPS than a HDD.

For the client PC usage model with approximately a 50:50 read/write ratio, a PC IOPS number can be calculated as follows:

Using this equation, the results for client SSD PC performance are as follows: 

 2006–2007 SSD generation: 5,000 Read IOPS; 10 Write IOPS; 20 PC IOPS
 2008 SSD generation: 10,000 Read IOPS; 100 Write IOPS; 200 PC IOPS
 2009 (estimated) SSD generation: 25,000 Read IOPS; 400 Write IOPS; 785 PC IOPS

Converting SSD IOPS rates into vRPM 
The vRPM performance of an SSD can be calculated as follows:

where:

 SSD IOPS (IWrite) is the sustained (to the SSD media) 4KB random write rate, Queue Depth=4
 SSD IOPS (IRead) is the sustained (to the SSD media) 4KB random read rate, Queue Depth=4
 50 is the product factor in the calculation

Using this calculation, SSD vRPM rates can be shown to be significantly better than HDD RPM rates, particularly in later generation SSDs: 

 2006–2007 SSD generation: 5,000 Read IOPS; 10 Write IOPS; 20 PC IOPS; 1,000 vRPM
 2008 SSD generation: 10,000 Read IOPS; 100 Write IOPS; 200 PC IOPS; 10,000 vRPM
 2009 (estimated) SSD generation: 25,000 Read IOPS; 400 Write IOPS; 785 PC IOPS; 40,000 vRPM
 2011 SSD generation: 35,000 Read IOPS; 14,000 Write IOPS; 24,500 PC IOPS; 1,225,000 vRPM

vRPM adoption in industry 
Despite its early objectives, vRPM has not become broadly supported in the industry and no longer appears on SanDisk's SSD website.

See also 
 Solid-state drive
 Hard disk drive
 Input/Output

Notes

References

External links 
 vRPM White Note by SanDisk

Computer storage devices